Muttam or "Muttom" is a small village located in the Indian Kannur District of Kerala.

Religion 
There are nearly 15 Muslim Mosques in Muttam. The prevalent religion in Muttam is Islam.

Politics 
Mixed political views.  Majority support to Indian Union Muslim League

Transportation
The national highway passes through Taliparamba town. Goa and Mumbai can be accessed on the northern side and Cochin and Thiruvananthapuram can be accessed on the southern side.  The road to the east of Iritty connects to Mysore and Bangalore. The nearest railway station is Pazhayangadi on Mangalore-Palakkad line.

Trains are available to almost all parts of India subject to advance booking over the internet. There are three international airports at Mangalore , Kannur and Calicut, all with direct flights to Middle Eastern countries.

See also

Kannur District
Payangadi
Kannur

References

Villages near Kannapuram